Following a decision by the EHF Executive Committee on May 27/28, 2005 which is based on the interest of the teams, the European Masters Handball Championships for men and women should be organised every year in the framework of a concept which shall combine the competitive target with the social aspects of handball in a more attractive way. 

European Handball Federation competitions
Senior sports competitions